Brewster station was a train station located at the corner of Route 137 and Underpass Road in Brewster, Massachusetts. The station was torn down before World War II.

References

External links

Brewster, Massachusetts
Old Colony Railroad Stations on Cape Cod
Stations along Old Colony Railroad lines
Former railway stations in Massachusetts